Lower Baddibu is one of the six districts of the North Bank Division of the Gambia. In the 2013 census, it had a population of 18,030.

References

North Bank Division
Districts of the Gambia